Heteronutarsus zolotarevskyi, common name Anubis mantis, is a species of praying mantis found in Chad.

See also
List of mantis genera and species

References

Mantodea of Africa
Insects described in 1940